Laurie Monnes Anderson (born December 31, 1945) is an American Democratic politician who most recently served in the Oregon Senate, representing District 25 in eastern Multnomah County, Oregon, including parts of the cities of Fairview, Gresham, Troutdale, and Wood Village. She previously served two terms in the Oregon House of Representatives.

Early life and career
Born Laurie Monnes in Coronado, California, she grew up in Gresham, Oregon, one of four children of Bud and Ellene Groening Monnes, who were both teachers. She graduated from Gresham High School and received a bachelor's degree in biology from Willamette University in 1968, and a master's in biology from the University of Colorado in 1972. In 1981, she earned a degree in nursing from Radford University. She married and raised two children, divorcing in 1985.

Political career
Following a career as a public health nurse, Monnes Anderson began serving on the Gresham-Barlow School District board in 1991. In 1998, she ran for the Oregon House of Representatives representing District 22, but lost to incumbent Ron Sunseri by 250 votes. In 2000, Sunseri did not seek re-election, and Monnes Anderson defeated Republican nominee Ed Golobay for the seat in a close election. She was re-elected to the seat (renumbered to District 50) by a wide margin in 2002 over Ernest Hodgin.

In 2004, she sought election to the Oregon Senate in District 25. In this race, she again faced Ron Sunseri, who had defeated her in her first House race in 1998. However, this time, Monnes Anderson prevailed by 9 percentage points in an expensive race.

She was unopposed for her party's nomination in 2008. She defeated Republican Dave Kim in the general election.

Personal
Monnes Anderson lives in Gresham, Oregon. She is a first cousin of cartoonist Matt Groening, the creator of The Simpsons. Monnes Anderson's mother, Ellene Groening Monnes, is the sister of Groening's father Homer.

References

External links
Legislative website
Project VoteSmart biography

1945 births
21st-century American politicians
21st-century American women politicians
American Methodists
American nurses
American women nurses
California Democrats
Gresham High School (Oregon) alumni
Living people
Members of the Oregon House of Representatives
Oregon Democrats
Oregon state senators
People from Gresham, Oregon
People from Coronado, California
Radford University alumni
University of Colorado Boulder alumni
Willamette University alumni
Women state legislators in Oregon